Ralf Pittelkow (born 9 April 1948 in Sønderborg, Denmark) is a Danish publisher of the extreme right online news site Den Korte Avis.

Pittelkow graduated as a student from high school in 1966 and holds a PhD in comparative literature from University of Copenhagen in 1973. From 1973 to 1992, he was assistant professor and associate professor at the Department of Comparative Literature at University of Copenhagen. For 17 years, until the end of 2011, he was a political commentator at the newspaper Morgenavisen Jyllands-Posten. Together with his wife, he founded the news site Den Korte Avis in 2012 where he maintains a position as editor-in-chief.

The credibility of Den Korte Avis is debated. In 2014, an article published by the Danish Union of Journalists said that Den Korte Avis damaged the reputation of journalists and argued that it, despite its name (in English: "The Short Newspaper"), was not a real newspaper, as it often copied from other sources and misrepresented news stories. In December 2016, numerous advertisers, such as McDonald's, IKEA, Nordea, Alm. Brand, Doctors Without Borders and others, pulled their ads from the site, due to claims that several of the news stories publicized on the site were "lies and fabrications".

Pittelkow was the personal assistant for the former Prime Minister of Denmark Poul Nyrup Rasmussen and has for many years been married to the politician Karen Jespersen. He has, like his wife, been active in both the Left Socialists, Socialist People's Party, and the Social Democrats.

In the book Islamister og Naivister: et anklageskrift (Islamists and Naivists: a bill of indictment), which he wrote together with his spouse, Danish journalist and politician Karen Jespersen, he warns of an underestimation of the Islamist threat. He published his autobiography Mit liv som dansker (My life as a Dane) in 2009.

In 1997, Pittelkow received the Laust Jensen Prize.

References

1948 births
Living people
Danish journalists
People from Sønderborg Municipality